Anacampsis agrimoniella is a moth of the family Gelechiidae. It was described by James Brackenridge Clemens in 1860. It is found in North America, where it has been recorded from Ontario and New York south to Florida, west to Illinois. The habitat consists of woodlands and wood edges.

The larvae feed on Agrimonia species.

References

Moths described in 1860
Anacampsis
Moths of North America